Anthony James Nares (17 December 1942 - 19 February 1996) was a British publisher.

Early life
Anthony James Nares was born on 17 December 1942, the son of John George Alastair Nares. His grandfather was Vice-Admiral John Dodd Nares, and his great-grandfather was Vice-Admiral Sir George Nares.

He was educated at Charterhouse School, and in France, where he became fluent in French and Spanish.

Career
In 1978, Nares founded Marketing Week Publications, and launched the magazine Marketing Week, in a partnership with Michael Chamberlain, who became the editor.

In 1982, Centaur Media , run by his friend Graham Sherren, bought Marketing Week, and Nares became Centaur's managing director.

Personal life
In 1975, Nares married Thomasin Gilbey, and they had one son together.

On 19 February 1996, he was killed in an avalanche while skiing in Klosters, Switzerland.

References

1942 births
1996 deaths
People educated at Charterhouse School
British expatriates in France
20th-century British businesspeople